Xunke County is a county of northern Heilongjiang province, People's Republic of China, bordering Russia's Amur Oblast to the north across the Amur River. It is under the jurisdiction of the prefecture-level city of Heihe.

Administrative divisions 
Xunke County is divided into 1 subdistrict, 3 towns and 6 townships. 
1 subdistrict
 Qike
3 towns
 Qike, Xunhe, Kelin
6 townships
 Ganchazi, Songshugou, Chelu, Xin'e, Xinxing, Baoshan

Demographics 

Climate

Notes and references

External links
  Government site

Xunke
Heihe